Tatarca may refer to:

 Tatarça, or Tatar, a Turkic language
 Tătarca, a village in Romania
 Tătarca River, a river in Romania

See also 
 Tatarka (disambiguation)
 Tatarşa (disambiguation)